Minshull Vernon United Reformed Church is located in Cross Lane, Minshull Vernon, Cheshire, England. It is recorded in the National Heritage List for England as a designated Grade II listed building.

History

The building was originally a Congregational church constructed in 1809. In 1884 the interior of the church was improved and heating was installed at a cost of nearly £470. The church was further renovated in 1906, electricity was installed in 1946, and a water supply was connected and a kitchen added in 1975.

Architecture

Constructed in brick, the church has a tiled roof. It is in four bays with a porch. On the sides of the church are two-light mullioned windows. On the north side is one original window containing Y-tracery. On the gables are ball finials. Inside the church a dado rail separates pine wainscotting below from the plastered walls above. At the east end of the church is an organ, in front of which is a U-shaped communion rail.

See also

Listed buildings in Minshull Vernon

References

United Reformed churches in England
Grade II listed churches in Cheshire
Churches completed in 1809